The 1981 Pittsburgh Steelers season was the franchise's 49th in the National Football League. After enduring an injury plagued 9–7 season the previous year, and missing the playoffs for the first time since 1971, the Steelers had hoped that the 1980 season was just a small hiatus from contending for championships. However, while the Steelers had flashes of their former glory years after starting the season with 2 unimpressive losses, the 1981 season would end in an 8–8 record and eventually prove the end of the Steelers great dynasty of the 1970s. The Steelers had a chance to make the playoffs with an 8-5 start to the year, but lost all of their last three games to miss the playoffs.

Offseason

NFL draft

Staff

Roster

Preseason

Schedule

Regular season

Schedule 

Note: Intra-division opponents are in bold text.

Game summaries

Week 1 (Sunday, September 6, 1981): vs. Kansas City Chiefs 

at Three Rivers Stadium, Pittsburgh, Pennsylvania

 Game time: 1:00 pm EDT
 Game weather: , wind 
 Game attendance: 53,305
 Referee: Jim Tunney
 TV announcers: (NBC) Bob Costas (play by play), Bob Trumpy (color commentator)

Scoring drives:

 Pittsburgh – Swann 18 pass from Bradshaw (kick failed)
 Kansas City – Marshall 48 pass from Kenney (Lowery kick)
 Kansas City – FG Lowery 35
 Pittsburgh – Harris 7 run (kick failed)
 Pittsburgh – Harris 1 run (Trout kick)
 Kansas City – FG Lowery 40
 Kansas City – Carson 53 pass from Kenney (Lowery kick)
 Pittsburgh – Hawthorne 1 run (Trout kick)
 Kansas City – FG Lowery 42
 Kansas City – McKnight 3 run (Lowery kick)
 Pittsburgh – Smith 41 pass from Bradshaw (Trout kick)
 Kansas City – Howard 65 fumble return (Lowery kick)

Week 2 (Thursday, September 10, 1981): at Miami Dolphins  

at Miami Orange Bowl, Miami, Florida

 Game time: 8:30 pm EDT
 Game weather: , wind 
 Game attendance: 74,190
 Referee: Red Cashion
 TV announcers: (ABC) Frank Gifford (play by play), Fran Tarkenton & Howard Cosell (color commentators)

Scoring drives:

 Pittsburgh – FG Trout 23
 Miami – Woodley 1 run (kick failed)
 Miami – Franklin 1 run (von Schamann kick)
 Pittsburgh – Smith 32 pass from Bradshaw (Trout kick)
 Miami – Nathan 13 pass from Woodley (von Schamann kick)
 Miami – Vigorito 87 punt return (von Schamann kick)
 Miami – FG von Schamann 32

Week 3 (Sunday, September 20, 1981): vs. New York Jets  

at Three Rivers Stadium, Pittsburgh, Pennsylvania

 Game time: 1:00 pm EDT
 Game weather: , wind 
 Game attendance: 52,973
 Referee: Gordon McCarter
 TV announcers: (NBC) Don Criqui (play by play), John Brodie (color commentator)

Scoring drives:

 Pittsburgh – Davis 9 run (Trout kick)
 Pittsburgh – FG Trout 25
 Pittsburgh – Pollard 23 run (Trout kick)
 New York Jets – FG Leahy 47
 Pittsburgh – Bradshaw 1 run (Trout kick)
 Pittsburgh – Pollard 1 run (Trout kick)
 Pittsburgh – Thornton 1 run (Trout kick)
 New York Jets – McNeil 17 pass from Ryan (Leahy kick)

Week 4 (Sunday, September 27, 1981): vs. New England Patriots  

at Three Rivers Stadium, Pittsburgh, Pennsylvania

 Game time: 1:00 pm EDT
 Game weather: , wind 
 Game attendance: 53,344
 Referee: Gene Barth
 TV announcers: (NBC) Bob Costas (play by play), Bob Trumpy (color commentator)

Scoring drives:

 Pittsburgh – Harris 1 run (Trout kick)
 Pittsburgh – Cunningham 1 pass from Bradshaw (Trout kick)
 New England – Cavanaugh 1 run (Smith kick)
 Pittsburgh – Harris 1 run (Trout kick)
 New England – Collins 10 run (Smith kick)
 New England – Morgan 12 pass from Cavanaugh (Smith kick)
 Pittsburgh – Swann 24 pass from Bradshaw

Week 5 (Sunday, October 4, 1981): at New Orleans Saints  

at Louisiana Superdome, New Orleans, Louisiana

 Game time: 2:00 pm EDT
 Game weather: Dome
 Game attendance: 64,578
 Referee: Jerry Seeman
 TV announcers: (NBC) Sam Nover (play by play), Harmon Wages (color commentator)

Scoring drives:

 Pittsburgh – Swann 16 pass from Bradshaw (Trout kick)
 Pittsburgh – FG Trout 25
 New Orleans – FG Ricardo 26
 Pittsburgh – FG Trout 43
 New Orleans – FG Ricardo 33
 Pittsburgh – Stallworth 47 pass from Bradshaw (Trout kick)

Week 6 (Sunday, October 11, 1981): vs. Cleveland Browns  

at Three Rivers Stadium, Pittsburgh, Pennsylvania

 Game time: 1:00 pm EDT
 Game weather: , wind 
 Game attendance: 53,255
 Referee: Ben Dreith
 TV announcers: (NBC) Don Criqui (play by play), John Brodie (color commentator)

Scoring drives:

 Pittsburgh – Stallworth 9 pass from Bradshaw (Trout kick)
 Pittsburgh – FG Trout 19
 Cleveland – Newsome 29 pass from Sipe (Bahr kick)
 Pittsburgh – FG Trout 23

Week 7 (Sunday, October 18, 1981): at Cincinnati Bengals  

at Riverfront Stadium, Cincinnati, Ohio

 Game time: 1:00 pm EDT
 Game weather: , wind 
 Game attendance: 57,090
 Referee: Jerry Markbreit
 TV announcers: (NBC) Don Criqui (play by play), John Brodie (color commentator)

Scoring drives:

 Cincinnati – FG Breech 27
 Cincinnati – Johnson 3 run (Breech kick)
 Cincinnati – FG Breech 23
 Cincinnati – Verser 73 pass from Ken Anderson (Breech kick)
 Cincinnati – Alexander 3 run (Breech kick)
 Cincinnati – Johnson 5 pass from Ken Anderson (Breech kick)
 Pittsburgh – Smith 17 pass from Bradshaw (Trout kick)

Week 8 (Monday, October 26, 1981): vs. Houston Oilers  

at Three Rivers Stadium, Pittsburgh, Pennsylvania

 Game time: 9:00 pm EST
 Game weather: , wind 
 Game attendance: 52,732
 Referee: Fred Silva
 TV announcers: (ABC) Frank Gifford (play by play), Don Meredith (color commentator)

Scoring drives:

 Pittsburgh – FG Trout 19
 Pittsburgh – Smith 46 pass from Bradshaw (Trout kick)
 Houston – FG Fritsch 34
 Pittsburgh – FG Trout 19
 Houston – Casper 52 pass from Stabler (Fritsch kick)
 Houston – FG Fritsch 44
 Pittsburgh – Stallworth 6 pass from Bradshaw (kick failed)
 Pittsburgh – Harris 1 run (Trout kick)

Week 9 (Sunday, November 1, 1981): vs. San Francisco 49ers  

at Three Rivers Stadium, Pittsburgh, Pennsylvania

 Game time: 1:00 pm EST
 Game weather: , wind 
 Game attendance: 52,878
 Referee: Bob Frederic
 TV announcers: (CBS) Vin Scully (play by play), Hank Stram (color commentator)

Scoring drives:

 San Francisco – Young 5 pass from Montana (Wersching kick)
 San Francisco – FG Wersching 45
 Pittsburgh – Blount 50 interception return (Trout kick)
 Pittsburgh – Smith 22 pass from Bradshaw (Trout kick)
 San Francisco – Easley 1 run (Wersching kick)

Week 10 (Sunday, November 8, 1981): at Seattle Seahawks  

at The Kingdome, Seattle, Washington

 Game time: 4:00 pm EST
 Game weather: Dome
 Game attendance: 59,058
 Referee: Dick Jorgensen
 TV announcers: (NBC) Jay Randolph (play by play), Rocky Bleier (color commentator)

Scoring drives:

 Pittsburgh – Harris 6 run (Trout kick)
 Seattle – FG Herrera 37
 Pittsburgh – Malone 90 pass from Bradshaw (Trout kick)
 Pittsburgh – Thornton 4 run (Trout kick)
 Seattle – Doornink 44 pass from Zorn (Herrera kick)
 Seattle – T. Brown 1 run (Herrera kick)
 Seattle – T. Brown 1 run (Herrera kick)

Week 11 (Sunday, November 15, 1981): at Atlanta Falcons  

at Atlanta–Fulton County Stadium, Atlanta, Georgia

 Game time: 1:00 pm EST
 Game weather: , wind 
 Game attendance: 57,485
 Referee: Pat Haggerty
 TV announcers: (NBC) Bob Costas (play by play), Bob Trumpy (color commentator)

Scoring drives:

 Pittsburgh – Cunningham 18 pass from Bradshaw (Trout kick)
 Pittsburgh – Stallworth 6 pass from Bradshaw (Trout kick)
 Atlanta – Jackson 35 pass from Bartkowski (Luckhurst kick)
 Pittsburgh – Stallworth 19 pass from Bradshaw (Trout kick)
 Atlanta – FG Luckhurst 43
 Pittsburgh – Grossman 14 pass from Bradshaw (kick blocked)
 Atlanta – Jenkins 30 pass from Bartkowski (Luckhurst kick)
 Pittsburgh – Swann 22 pass from Bradshaw (Trout kick)
 Atlanta – FG Luckhurst 22

Week 12 (Sunday, November 22, 1981): at Cleveland Browns  

at Cleveland Municipal Stadium, Cleveland, Ohio

 Game time: 1:00 pm EST
 Game weather: , wind 
 Game attendance: 77,958
 Referee: Gene Barth
 TV announcers: (NBC) Don Criqui (play by play), John Brodie (color commentator)

Scoring drives:

 Cleveland – FG Bahr 33
 Pittsburgh – Hawthorne 1 run (kick failed)
 Pittsburgh – Thornton 3 run (kick failed)
 Cleveland – Logan 13 pass from Sipe (Bahr kick)
 Pittsburgh – Harris 2 run (kick failed)
 Pittsburgh – Pinney 1 pass from Bradshaw (Trout kick)
 Pittsburgh – Moser 5 pass from Bradshaw (Trout kick)

Week 13 (Sunday, November 29, 1981): vs. Los Angeles Rams  

at Three Rivers Stadium, Pittsburgh, Pennsylvania

 Game time: 1:00 pm EST
 Game weather: , wind 
 Game attendance: 51,854
 Referee: Tom Dooley
 TV announcers: (CBS) Vin Scully (play by play), Hank Stram (color commentator)

Scoring drives:

 Pittsburgh – Harris 1 run (Trout kick)
 Pittsburgh – Swann 9 pass from Bradshaw (Trout kick)
 Pittsburgh – Bradshaw 1 run (Trout kick)
 Pittsburgh – FG Trout 21

Week 14 (Monday, December 7, 1981): at Oakland Raiders  

at Oakland–Alameda County Coliseum, Oakland, California

 Game time: 9:00 pm EST
 Game weather: , wind 
 Game attendance: 51,769
 Referee: Jim Tunney
 TV announcers: (ABC) Frank Gifford (play by play), Don Meredith & Howard Cosell (color commentators)

Scoring drives:

 Pittsburgh – Cunningham 5 pass from Bradshaw (Trout kick)
 Oakland – Ramsey 25 pass from Wilson (Bahr kick)
 Pittsburgh – Smith 19 pass from Malone (Trout kick)
 Oakland – Whittington 17 pass from Wilson (Bahr kick)
 Pittsburgh – Malone 11 run (kick failed)
 Oakland – Chandler 36 pass from Wilson (kick failed)
 Oakland – Watts 53 punt return (Bahr kick)
 Oakland – FG Bahr 29
 Pittsburgh – Smith 17 pass from Malone (Trout kick)

Week 15 (Sunday, December 13, 1981): vs. Cincinnati Bengals  

at Three Rivers Stadium, Pittsburgh, Pennsylvania

 Game time: 1:00 pm EST
 Game weather: , wind 
 Game attendance: 50,623
 Referee: Red Cashion
 TV announcers: (NBC) Don Criqui (play by play), John Brodie (color commentator)

Scoring drives:

 Pittsburgh – FG Trout 48
 Cincinnati – FG Breech 38
 Cincinnati – Curtis 2 pass from Ken Anderson (Breech kick)
 Cincinnati – Kreider 22 pass from Ken Anderson (Breech kick)
 Pittsburgh – Harris 2 pass from Malone (Trout kick)

Week 16 (Sunday, December 20, 1981): at Houston Oilers  

at Astrodome, Houston, Texas

 Game time: 4:00 pm EST
 Game weather: Dome
 Game attendance: 41,056
 Referee: Bob McElwee
 TV announcers: (NBC) Phil Stone (play by play), Gene Washington (color commentator)

Scoring drives:

 Pittsburgh – FG Trout 40
 Houston – Casper 15 pass from Nielsen (Fritsch kick)
 Houston – Casper 23 pass from Nielsen (Fritsch kick)
 Pittsburgh – FG Trout 37
 Pittsburgh – Thornton 17 run (Trout kick)
 Pittsburgh – Malone 2 run (Trout kick)
 Houston – Casper 16 pass from Nielsen (Fritsch kick)

Standings

References 
1. Pittsburgh Steelers Media Guide 1982

External links
 1981 Pittsburgh Steelers season at Profootballreference.com 
 1981 Pittsburgh Steelers season statistics at jt-sw.com 

Pittsburgh Steelers seasons
Pittsburgh Steelers
Pitts